Roni Sugeng Ariyanto (born 18 April 1998) is an Indonesian professional footballer who plays as a central midfielder for Liga 1 club Persikabo 1973.

Club career

Persikabo 1973 / PS TNI
In 2017, Sugeng joined Liga 1 club PS TNI. He made his debut on 5 May 2017 in a match against Persiba Balikpapan. On 14 July 2017, Sugeng scored his first goal for PS TNI in the 74th minute against Sriwijaya at the Gelora Sriwijaya Stadium, Palembang.

Career statistics

Club

Honours

Club
PS TNI U-21
 Indonesia Soccer Championship U-21: 2016

References

External links 
 Roni Sugeng at Soccerway
 Roni Sugeng at Liga Indonesia

1998 births
Living people
Indonesian footballers
Association football midfielders
Liga 1 (Indonesia) players
PS TIRA players
Persikabo 1973 players
People from Sragen Regency
Sportspeople from Central Java